Roy Williams may refer to:

Entertainment
Roy Williams (artist) (1907–1976), artist and entertainer for The Walt Disney Studios
Roy Williams (broadcaster), BBC radio continuity announcer
Roy Williams (trombonist) (born 1937), English trombonist
Roy Williams (playwright) (born 1968), contemporary British playwright
Roy H. Williams, American non-fiction author

Sports

American football
Roy Williams (defensive tackle) (born 1937), American football player
Roy Williams (safety) (born 1980), American football safety
Roy Williams (wide receiver) (born 1981), American football wide receiver

Other sports
Roy Williams (decathlete) (born 1934), New Zealand athlete
Roy Williams (Australian footballer, born 1929) (1929–1988), Australian footballer for Collingwood
Roy Williams (Australian footballer, born 1907) (1907–1979), Australian footballer for Footscray
Roy Williams (basketball coach) (born 1950), American basketball coach
Roy Williams (basketball player) (1927–2020), Canadian basketball player
Roy Williams (footballer) (1932–2011), Southampton and Hereford United footballer
Roy Williams (cricketer) (born 1931), English cricketer
Roy S. Williams (1907–1944), American baseball pitcher in the Negro leagues

Other
Roy Hughes Williams (1874–1946), justice of the Supreme Court of Ohio
Roy Lee Williams (1915–1989), Teamsters labor union president
Roy T. Williams (1883–1946), Church of the Nazarene superintendent
Roy Williams (Scouting) (born 1944), Boy Scouts of America director
Roy David Williams, physicist and data scientist
Roy Williams Airport, in Joshua Tree, California